GFL Environmental Inc. (also known as Green For Life or GFL) is a waste management company with headquarters in Toronto, Canada. GFL operates in all provinces in Canada, and currently employs more than 8,850 people. The company provides environmental services to municipal, residential, commercial, industrial and institutional customers. On July 6, 2021, the company announced the formation of the Resource Recovery Alliance (RRA) and an agreement to acquire Canadian Stewardship Services Alliance.

Company history 

GFL Environmental Inc. was founded in 2007 by Canadian entrepreneur and businessman Patrick Dovigi, who had previous experience in the environmental services industry and wanted to establish a company that could unlock the value in smaller waste companies in Canada.

In recent history, GFL, along with subsidiaries under its control, has faced a number of workplace safety and environmental issues. Environmental issues include the spill of 200,000 gallons of used oil by a subsidiary in Illinois; a $300,000 fine from violation of federal guidelines on the sale of tetrachloroethylene (the company and its CEO, Patrick Dovigi, were charged with violation of the Canadian Environmental Protection Act); and an injunction by a Cobb County, Georgia court halting the operation of a landfill. Recent workplace deaths include that of a 31-year-old employee in an industrial accident in 2018 and a 45-year-old-employee trapped under a garbage truck in 2019.

Growth 

GFL was originally established from the merger of several Ontario environmental services firms, including Direct Line Environmental, National Waste Services and Enviro West.

The same year that GFL was founded, the company gained the investment interest of Canaccord Genuity Corp. Three years later, in 2010, Roark Capital Group, an Atlanta private equity firm, made a $105 million investment in GFL.

GFL began to acquire environmental solution firms around Canada.  In 2011, GFL acquired Turtle Island Recycling, a recycling company operating in Toronto.

In 2014, GFL acquired the waste collection business of Contrans Group Inc., giving the company a larger solid waste management presence in Edmonton and Slave Lake, Alberta. Also in 2014, GFL purchased the business operated by Waste Management in the provinces of Nova Scotia, New Brunswick, and Newfoundland and Labrador.

A reorganization of GFL's share capital was completed in late 2014. The reorganization saw Roark Capital Group, which had provided capital to GFL since 2010, selling its stake in the company. The reorganization introduced a new investor for GFL, Highbridge Principal Strategies (HPS).

GFL announced on September 30, 2016, it completed a merger of Rizzo Environmental Services, Inc. and its subsidiary companies ("Rizzo Environmental" ) with a new U.S. subsidiary of GFL. Rizzo Environmental had provided collection services to more than 40 municipalities in Southeastern Michigan. Its recycling operations, with 3 commercial recycling facilities, had served customers in lower Michigan and northern Ohio. GFL purchased Rizzo Environmental around the same time that Rizzo's CEO, Chuck Rizzo, was indicted for bribery and wire fraud, among other charges.

In 2018, its U.S. subsidiary purchased Waste Industries of Raleigh, North Carolina for an undisclosed price.

In March 2020, the company held its initial public offering on the Toronto Stock Exchange, pricing shares at $19 each and raising $1.4 billion, giving the company as a whole a market value of $6.1 billion.

In July 2021, GFL created the Resource Recovery Alliance (RRA) in response to the Government of Ontario's extended producer responsibility (EPR) regulation requiring product and packaging producers to operate and fully finance Ontario's Blue Box program.

Residential solid waste operations 

In 2011, GFL won a seven-year contract to collect residential garbage from approximately 165,000 homes in west Toronto, specifically in the residential neighborhoods between Yonge Street and the Humber River. The contract was expected to save the city roughly $11 million per year or $78 million over its total term. GFL's award of the contract was particularly publicized because it represented one of Toronto's first moves to privatize and outsource the city's residential garbage collection.

GFL's contract with the city of Toronto to collect residential waste west of Yonge Street began in August 2012.

In January 2015, the Halifax council awarded GFL three new contracts to collect residential waste in Halifax for the next four years

In 2016, the city of Windsor chose to keep their waste and recycling collection service outsourced and elected to retain GFL's services for the next seven years. Windsor first contracted out its waste collection to GFL in 2010 after the city's workers went on a prolonged strike.

Soil remediation, excavation, shoring and foundation business. 

In 2011, GFL was awarded a contract by the city of Toronto to excavate the site of the Pan Am Aquatics Centre in Toronto that was opened for the Pan Am Games in July 2015. In January 2016, GFL acquired Anchor Shoring Group to expand its services offered through its soil remediation, excavation and infrastructure group.

Acquisitions 
In February 2016, GFL completed the acquisition of Services Matrec Inc. (Matrec), the waste management division of Montreal-based TransForce. The $800 million purchase represented GFL's largest acquisition in its company history and was supported by an equity investment of $458 million made by a fund managed by Macquarie Group and an additional investment provided by Highbridge Principal Strategies and other co-investors.

The Matrec acquisition also represented GFL's entrance into the Quebec and eastern Ontario markets and increased GFL's total valuation to roughly $2.4 billion.

Also in 2016, a new acquisition was announced with Canadian private equity firm, Novacap and Developpement EDB Inc., agreeing to sell Corporation de Developpement de Enviro-Viridis Inc., a Quebec-based environmental services firm, to GFL.

On August 17, 2021, GFL acquired solid waste business, Terrapure Environmental Ltd., and its subsidiaries for $743.8 million. The deal did not include Terrapure's battery recycling business.

In May 2022, the GFL acquired Sprint Waste Services, a solid waste company with assets in Texas and Louisiana.

See also
 Carbon Solutions Global

References 

Waste management companies of Canada
Environmental agencies in Canada
Business services companies established in 2007
Canadian companies established in 2007
2020 initial public offerings
Companies listed on the Toronto Stock Exchange
Waste companies established in 2007